Frank Burt was an American screenwriter, who wrote for TV, film, and radio.

He was one of the writers of the James Stewart radio drama The Six Shooter.  He also co-wrote the Stewart film The Man from Laramie.  He was highly regarded by Stewart.  The TV series The Restless Gun was based on a story and characters Frank Burt created.

References

External links
https://www.imdb.com/name/nm5042917/ on IMDb

American male screenwriters
Year of death missing
Year of birth missing